The 1975–76 South-West Indian Ocean cyclone season was a below-average cyclone season. The season officially ran from November 1, 1975, to April 30, 1976.

Systems

Moderate Tropical Storm Audrey

Moderate Tropical Storm Audrey developed on November 17. Audrey struck Madagascar shortly before dissipating on November 29.

Tropical Cyclone Barbara

Severe Tropical Storm Barbara developed on December 3. It made landfall in Madagascar twice before dissipating on December 19.

Very Intense Tropical Cyclone Clotilde

Very Intense Tropical Cyclone Clotilde developed on January 7. It struck Madagascar and continued southeastward in the Indian Ocean before dissipating on January 21.

Very Intense Tropical Cyclone Terry–Danae

Cyclone Danae first affected Agaléga, where the storm destroyed the wind gauge. The storm also produced high waves that affected the northern coast of Réunion, flooding coastal roads. Cyclone Danae later struck Madagascar and then hit the east coast of Mozambique and South Africa in late January 1976.  50 people were killed in the flooding that resulted from the heavy rainfall of Cyclone Danae.

Moderate Tropical Storm Ella

Moderate Tropical Storm Ella developed on March 9. It struck Mozambique shortly before dissipating on March 12.

Moderate Tropical Storm Frederique

Tropical Disturbance Frederique existed from March 25 to March 26. it formed shortly before dissipating.

Moderate Tropical Storm Gladys

Moderate Tropical Storm Gladys developed on March 27. It struck Madagascar and later Mozambique. Gladys then moved erratically in the Mozambique Channel before dissipating on April 10.

Moderate Tropical Storm Bert–Heliotrope

Moderate Tropical Storm Bert–Heliotrope existed from April 3 to April 12. It caused no damage or casualties and did not make landfall.

Season effects

|-
| Audrey ||  || bgcolor=#| || bgcolor=#| || bgcolor=#| || None ||  ||  ||
|-
| Barbara ||  || bgcolor=#| || bgcolor=#| || bgcolor=#| || None ||  ||  ||
|-
| Clotilde ||  || bgcolor=#| || bgcolor=#| || bgcolor=#| || None ||  ||  ||
|-
| Terry–Danae ||  || bgcolor=#| || bgcolor=#| || bgcolor=#| || None ||  ||  ||
|-
| Elsa ||  || bgcolor=#| || bgcolor=#| || bgcolor=#| || None ||  ||  ||
|-
| Frederique ||  || bgcolor=#| || bgcolor=#| || bgcolor=#| || None ||  ||  ||
|-
| Gladys ||  || bgcolor=#| || bgcolor=#| || bgcolor=#| || None ||  ||  ||
|-
| Bert–Heliotrope ||  || bgcolor=#| || bgcolor=#| || bgcolor=#| || None ||  ||  ||
|-
| Carol	||  || bgcolor=#| || bgcolor=#| || bgcolor=#| || None ||  ||  ||
|-

See also
Atlantic hurricane seasons: 1975, 1976
Eastern Pacific hurricane seasons: 1975, 1976
Western Pacific typhoon seasons: 1975, 1976
North Indian Ocean cyclone seasons: 1975, 1976

References

South-West Indian Ocean cyclone seasons
1975–76 Southern Hemisphere tropical cyclone season